Marshall County High School is a secondary school in the Draffenville area of unincorporated Marshall County, Kentucky, United States, near Benton.

History

Marshall County High School was incorporated in 1974 as a merger of North Marshall High School, Benton High School, and South Marshall High School which all became junior high schools (grades 7-9). The school first consisted of grades 10-12. The first Graduating class was May 1975. In 1988, the high school took on 9th grade.. The county junior high schools became middle schools and took on 6th grade from the elementary schools.

Marshall County High School also had a Vocational Education School for adults and students alike which opened a year earlier in 1973. It is now known as Marshall County Technology Center which houses its various vocational trades for the students.

Notable alumni
 Cody Ryan Forsythe, professional baseball player
Dan Langhi, professional basketball player

Marshall County Hoop Fest 
Marshall County High School is the site of a national invitational preparatory basketball showcase called Marshall County Hoop Fest. The event, held in Reed Condor Gymnasium, hosts nationally ranked teams in a weekend event open to the public. Players like Carmelo Anthony, Kevin Durant, Derrick Rose, and Josh Smith have all played in the event over the years.

References

External links
 

Marshall County, Kentucky
Public high schools in Kentucky
1974 establishments in Kentucky